Events in the year 2020 in Mongolia.

Incumbents 

 President: Khaltmaagiin Battulga
 Prime Minister: Ukhnaagiin Khürelsükh

Events 

 27 January – The Mongolian government announced they would close the border with China. They also began closing schools on the same day.
 10 March – Deputy Prime Minister Ölziisaikhany Enkhtüvshin announced that a French national arriving in Ulaanbaatar via a flight from Moscow was the first confirmed COVID-19 case in the country.
 21 March – Establishment of the Right Person Electorate Coalition

Deaths

Molom Tsend, 88,mongolian politician

References 

 
2020s in Mongolia
Years of the 21st century in Mongolia
Mongolia
Mongolia